The 1984 Indian general election were held to elect 20 members to the eighth Lok Sabha from Kerala. Indian National Congress (INC)-led United Democratic Front (UDF) won 18 seats while Left Democratic Front (LDF), led by Communist Party of India (Marxist) (CPI(M)) won just 2 seats. Turnout for the election was at 77.12% In the Lok Sabha, INC won by a landslide and its leader Rajiv Gandhi went on to become the Prime Minister of India.

Alliances and parties 

UDF is a Kerala legislative alliance formed by INC veteran K. Karunakaran. LDF comprises primarily of CPI(M) and the CPI, forming the Left Front in the national level. Bharatiya Janata Party (BJP) contested in 5 seats.

United Democratic Front

Left Democratic Front

List of elected MPs

Results

Performance of political parties

By constituency

See also 

 Elections in Kerala
 Politics of Kerala

References 

Elections in Kerala